Chatribari is a locality in north west of Guwahati. It is near Guwahati Railway Station.

Health facilities
Chatribari hospital is located here.

Education
There are various educational institutes located here such as Nichols English School and K.C Das Commerce college to name a few.

See also
 Chandmari
 Bhangagarh
 Beltola
 Athgaon
 Assam Trunk Rd

References

  

Neighbourhoods in Guwahati